"Morning wood" is one of several similar slang or colloquial terms referring to the phenomenon of nocturnal penile tumescence (erection during and immediately following sleep).

Morning wood or Morningwood may refer to:

Music
 Morning Wood, 1994 hard rock album by Tony Harnell and others
 Morning Wood, 1995 debut rock album by The Rugburns
 Morning Wood, 2000 country album by Rodney Carrington
 Morningwood, alternative rock band from New York City
 Morningwood (album), 2006 debut album of the eponymous rock band

Television
 Morningwood Condominiums, the fictional residence of Peter Gibbons in the film Office Space
 "The Mystery of Morning Wood", a 1995 episode of the MTV animated comedy series Beavis and Butt-head
 Morningwood Academy, an academy Chris joins in the Family Guy episode "No Chris Left Behind"

Other
 Morning Wood, a controversial t-shirt worn by Dick and Dom in 2004

See also